Lee Sang-hoon (born 20 September 1972) is a South Korean former professional tennis player.

Lee, a graduate of Konkuk University, spent his career competing mostly at satellite and Futures level. He featured in the qualifying draw for the 1995 Australian Open and was a quarter-finalist at the 1995 Seoul Challenger. In 1996 he made an ATP Tour main draw appearance at the Korea Open, where he fell in the first round to top seed Byron Black.

ITF Futures titles

Doubles: (2)

References

External links
 
 

1972 births
Living people
South Korean male tennis players
Konkuk University alumni
20th-century South Korean people